Rasbora vaillantii is a species of ray-finned fish in the genus Rasbora which is found in Borneo.

References

Rasboras
Freshwater fish of Borneo
Fish described in 1905
Taxa named by Canna Maria Louise Popta